Eadred Ætheling (Old English Eadred Æþeling) (died c. 1012) was the fourth of the six sons of King Æthelred the Unready by his first wife Ælfgifu. He witnessed charters between 993 and 1012 or 1013, but died before his father was forced to flee to Normandy in late 1013.

See also
House of Wessex family tree

References

External links
 ; also 

10th-century births
1010s deaths
Year of birth unknown
Year of death uncertain
Anglo-Saxon royalty
10th-century English people
11th-century English people
House of Wessex
Sons of kings